On the Beach is the 5th studio album by Canadian-American musician Neil Young, released by Reprise Records in July 1974. The album is the second of the so-called "Ditch Trilogy" of albums that Young recorded following the major success of 1972's Harvest, whereupon the scope of his success and acclaim became apparent; On the Beach was inspired by his feelings of retreat, alienation, and melancholy in response to this success.

In addition to its release on vinyl, On the Beach was also released on cassette and 8-track cartridge, though the track listing for the latter formats was the reverse of that on the vinyl album. It remained unavailable on CD until 2003, when a remastered version was finally released. It has since been re-released as Disc 2 of the 4-CD box set Neil Young Original Release Series Discs 5-8. The album is also available in high-resolution audio on the Neil Young Archives website, where four additional album outtakes were added in February 2021.

Background
Looking back on the album for the liner notes to the Decade box set, Young wrote that the experience of releasing Harvest, which inspired the despairing themes of On the Beach, "put me in the middle of the road. Traveling there soon became a bore, so I headed for the ditch. A rougher ride but I saw more interesting people there." Recorded after (but released before) Tonight's the Night, On the Beach shares some of that album's bleakness and crude production—which came as a shock to fans and critics alike, as this was the long-awaited studio follow-up to the commercially and critically successful Harvest—but also included hints pointing towards a more subtle outlook, particularly on the opening track, "Walk On".

While the original Rolling Stone review described it as "one of the most despairing albums of the decade", later critics such as Allmusic's William Ruhlmann used the benefit of hindsight to conclude that Young "[w]as saying goodbye to despair, not being overwhelmed by it". The despair of Tonight's the Night, communicated through intentional underproduction and lyrical pessimism, gives way to a more polished album that is still pessimistic but to a lesser degree.

Much like Tonight's the Night, On the Beach was not a commercial success at the time of its release, but over time has attained a high regard from fans and critics alike. The album was recorded in a haphazard manner, with Young utilizing a variety of session musicians, and often changing their instruments while offering only barebones arrangements for them to follow (in a similar style to Tonight's the Night). He also would opt for rough, monitor mixes of songs rather than a more polished sound, alienating his sound engineers in the process.

Throughout the recording of the album, Young and his colleagues consumed a homemade concoction dubbed "Honey Slides", a goop of sauteed marijuana and honey that "felt like heroin", at the behest of session musician and de facto producer Rusty Kershaw. This may account for the mellow mood of the album, particularly the second half of the LP. Young has said of it "Good album. One side of it particularly—the side with 'Ambulance Blues', 'Motion Pictures' and 'On the Beach'—it's out there. It's a great take."

Availability
For about two decades, rarity made a cult out of On the Beach. The title was deleted from vinyl in the early 1980s and was only briefly available on cassette and 8-track cartridge tape, or European imports or bootlegs. Along with three other mid-period Young albums, it was withheld from re-release until 2003. The reasons for this remain murky, but there is some evidence that Young himself did not want the album out on CD, variously citing "fidelity problems" and legal issues. Beginning in 2000, over 5,000 fans signed an online petition calling for the release of the album on CD. It was finally released on CD on Reprise Records in August 2003.

Music
On the Beach is a folk rock album exploring themes of anger, alienation, and cautious optimism.

"Walk On", the album's opener, has Young combining his melancholy outlook with a wish to move on and keep living. The track is followed by a rendition of his Harvest-era "See the Sky About to Rain", which had been covered by the Byrds a year earlier on their eponymous reunion album. "Revolution Blues" was inspired by Charles Manson, whom Young had met in his Topanga Canyon days. "For the Turnstiles" is a country-folk hybrid featuring Young's banjo guitar and a harmony vocal from Ben Keith, who also plays dobro on the track. The side closes with "Vampire Blues", a cynical attack on the oil industry.

Side two of the LP version opens with "On the Beach", a slow, bluesy meditation on the downsides of fame which has been covered by many artists including Radiohead and Golden Smog, and is followed by "Motion Pictures", an elegy for Young's relationship with actress Carrie Snodgress.

"Ambulance Blues" closes the album. In a 1992 interview for the French Guitare & Claviers magazine, Young discussed Bert Jansch's influence on the song: "As for acoustic guitar, Bert Jansch is on the same level as Jimi [Hendrix]. That first record of his is epic. It came from England, and I was especially taken by 'Needle of Death', such a beautiful and angry song. That guy was so good. And years later, on On the Beach, I wrote the melody of 'Ambulance Blues' by styling the guitar part completely on 'Needle of Death'. I wasn't even aware of it, and someone else drew my attention to it." The song explores Young's feelings about his critics, Richard Nixon, and the state of CSNY. The line "You're all just pissing in the wind" was a direct quote from Young's manager regarding the inactivity of the quartet. The song also references the Riverboat, a small coffeehouse in Toronto's Yorkville neighbourhood which was an early venue for folk-inspired artists like Gordon Lightfoot, Bruce Cockburn, Joni Mitchell, Simon & Garfunkel, and Arlo Guthrie. The line "Oh, Isabella, proud Isabella, they tore you down and plowed you under" references 88 Isabella Street, an old rooming house in Toronto where Neil and Rick James stayed for a period. It was demolished in the early 1970s and an apartment now stands on its location.

Originally Young had intended for the A and B sides of the LP to be in reverse order but was convinced by David Briggs to swap them at the last moment. Young has said that he later came to regret caving in, although both the cassette and 8-track versions were released with the sides swapped.

Reception

Reviewing in Christgau's Record Guide: Rock Albums of the Seventies (1981), Robert Christgau wrote: "Something in [Young's] obsessive self-examination is easy to dislike and something in his whiny thinness hard to enjoy. But even 'Ambulance Blues,' an eight-minute throwaway, is studded with great lines, one of which is 'It's hard to know the meaning of this song.' And I can hum it for you if you'd like."

Pitchfork listed it #65 on their list of the Top 100 Albums of the 1970s. On the Beach was certified gold in the United States, selling 500,000 copies. In 2007, On the Beach was placed at #40 in Bob Mersereau's book The Top 100 Canadian Albums.  It was voted number 195 in Colin Larkin's All Time Top 1000 Albums in 2000. In 2020, Rolling Stone included the album at number 311 on their list of The 500 Greatest Albums of All Time, writing: "Reeling from the losses that sparked Tonight's the Night the previous year, Neil Young shelved that album for a while and made this one instead: a wild fireball of anger (“Revolution Blues”), nihilism (“For the Turnstiles”), and tentative optimism (“Walk On”). The album peaks on Side Two, a stoned symphony of grieving whose three songs (“On the Beach,” “Motion Pictures,” “Ambulance Blues”) are among the most emotionally real in Young's catalogue."

Tributes
Brent Lott of the Winnipeg Contemporary dancers developed a dance piece called For the Turnstiles in 2015. The music was scored by fellow Winnipeg singer-songwriter John K. Samson, who later released several of the songs on his 2016 solo album, Winter Wheat. In particular, "Postdoc Blues" and "Vampire Alberta Blues" were inspired by On the Beach.

Track listing
All tracks are written by Neil Young. All track timings are from the original vinyl release, R 2180.

Personnel
 Neil Young – vocals; guitar on "Walk On", "Revolution Blues", "Vampire Blues", "On the Beach", "Motion Pictures" and "Ambulance Blues"; harmonica on "See the Sky About to Rain", "Motion Pictures" and "Ambulance Blues"; Wurlitzer electric piano on "See the Sky About to Rain"; banjo guitar on "For the Turnstiles"; electric tambourine on "Ambulance Blues"
 Ben Keith – slide guitar, vocal on "Walk On", steel guitar on "See the Sky About to Rain"; Wurlitzer electric piano on "Revolution Blues"; Dobro, vocal on "For the Turnstiles"; organ, vocal, and hair drum on "Vampire Blues"; hand drums on "On the Beach"; bass on "Motion Pictures" and "Ambulance Blues"
 Rusty Kershaw – slide guitar on "Motion Pictures"; fiddle on "Ambulance Blues"
 David Crosby – rhythm guitar on "Revolution Blues"
 George Whitsell – guitar on "Vampire Blues"
 Graham Nash – Wurlitzer electric piano on "On the Beach"
 Tim Drummond – bass on "See the Sky About to Rain", "Vampire Blues" and "On the Beach"; percussion on "Vampire Blues"
 Billy Talbot – bass on "Walk On"
 Rick Danko – bass on "Revolution Blues"
 Ralph Molina – drums and vocal on "Walk On"; drums on "Vampire Blues" and "On the Beach"; hand drums on "Motion Pictures" and "Ambulance Blues"
 Levon Helm – drums on "See the Sky About to Rain" and "Revolution Blues"

Technical
 Gary Burden – art direction, design
 Bob Seidemann – cover photography

Note
† Neil Young credited as Joe Yankee
 All songs recorded at Sunset Sound, Los Angeles, except "Walk On" and "For The Turnstiles", recorded at Broken Arrow Studios, San Francisco (Woodside, nr. Redwood City, nr. San Francisco)

Charts

Singles

Year End Album Charts

Certifications

References

Neil Young albums
Albums produced by David Briggs (producer)
1974 albums
Reprise Records albums
Albums produced by Al Schmitt
Albums produced by Neil Young
Albums recorded at Sunset Sound Recorders
Albums with cover art by Rick Griffin